Adolphe Joseph Carcassonne (1826 – 22 September 1891) was a French poet and dramatist. A friend of Gaston Crémieux, he ruled the first Commune of his native Marseille (1870)
His principal works are:
 , a selection of poems (1852)
 , opera in four acts (1860)
 , drama in four acts in verse (1861)
 , drama in five acts (1862)
 , a one-act play (1863)
 , a selection of poems (1869)
 , an Alsatian legend in verse, in memory of 1871 (1878)
 , short comedies in verse (1878)
  (1878)
  (1880)
  (1881)
 , a selection of plays for young amateurs
  (1884)
 , short plays in verse (1885)
  (1886)
 , a selection of plays for young girls (1887)

References
 Larousse, Grand dictionnaire universel, 2d Supplement, p. 733.
 

Writers from Marseille
1826 births
1891 deaths
19th-century French dramatists and playwrights
19th-century French poets